Galyna Tarasova (born 23 September 1993) is a Ukrainian judoka.

She is the bronze medallist of the 2018 Judo Grand Prix Tunis in the +78 kg category.

References

External links
 

1992 births
Living people
Ukrainian female judoka
European Games competitors for Ukraine
Judoka at the 2019 European Games
21st-century Ukrainian women